The 2014 Vuelta a Colombia was the 64th edition of the Vuelta a Colombia cycling stage race, and was held from 6 to 17 August 2014. It was won by the Spanish cyclist Óscar Sevilla.

Teams
Twenty-one teams competed in the 2014 Vuelta a Colombia. These included UCI Professional Continental team  and three UCI Continental teams.

The teams that participated in the race were:

Aguardiente Néctar–Cundinamarca Calidad de Vida

Boyacá se Atreve–Liciboy
Club Ciclo Valle

EBSA–Indeportes Boyacá

Formesan–Bogotá Humana–ETB
Fuerzas Armadas–Ejército Nacional
Gobernación de Santander–Indersantander
Gobernación del César

Liga de ciclísmo del Chocó
Lotería de Boyacá

Rionegro con más Futuro
Super Giros–Blanco del Valle–Redetrans

Route

Stages

Stage 1
6 August 2014 — Piedecuesta to Bucaramanga, team time trial (TTT)

Stage 2
7 August 2014 — San Gil to Barbosa,

Stage 3
8 August 2014 – Barbosa to Tunja,

Stage 4
9 August 2014 — Nobsa to Cota,

Stage 5
10 August 2014 — Madrid to Ibagué,

Stage 6
11 August 2014 – Ibagué to Pereira,

Stage 7
13 August 2014 — Dosquebradas to Dosquebradas,

Stage 8
14 August 2014 – Pereira to Manizales,

Stage 9
15 August 2014 – Manizales to La Estrella,

Stage 10

Stage 11
17 August 2014 – Medellín to Medellín,

References

External links
Archived version of UCI results for the 2014 Vuelta a Colombia

Vuelta a Colombia
Colombia
Vuelta Colombia